is private boys' junior and senior high school in Ikebukuro, Toshima, Tokyo.

History
Bishop Channing Moore Williams established Rikkyo Junior High School in Tsukiji, Tokyo in 1896. The original building was destroyed by the Great Kantō earthquake, so a new building in Ikebukuro opened in 1923. The school was re-established in the post-World War II period in 1948.

The school was renamed Rikkyo Ikebukuro Junior High School in 2000, and in the same year its senior high school division was established.

Notable alumni
Takeshi Takashina, Imperial Japanese Army general
Hiroshi Sekiguchi, actor (middle school)
Monta Mino, TV presenter (middle school)
Oji Hiroi, author (middle school)
Bokuzen Hidari, actor
Jōtarō Kawakami, politician
Masato Yokota, track and field athlete
Yukihiro Takahashi, musician (middle school)
Kento Misao, footballer

References

External links
Rikkyo Ikebukuro Junior and Senior High School 
English Information

High schools in Tokyo
Schools in Tokyo
1896 establishments in Japan
Educational institutions established in 1896
Boys' schools in Japan